Outman is a German surname. Notable people with the surname include:

James Outman (born 1997), American baseball player
Josh Outman (born 1984), American baseball pitcher
Pat Outman (born  1992), American politician
Rick Outman (born 1963), American politician

German-language surnames